Louis Chaillot (2 March 1914 – 28 January 1998) was a cyclist from France. He was born in Chaumont, France.

He competed for France in the 1932 Summer Olympics held in Los Angeles, United States in the tandem event where he finished in first place and in the individual sprint event where he finished in second place.

He also competed in the 1936 Summer Olympics held in Berlin, Germany in the individual sprint event but was only able to finish in third place.

References

1914 births
1998 deaths
French male cyclists
Olympic cyclists of France
Olympic gold medalists for France
Olympic silver medalists for France
Olympic bronze medalists for France
Cyclists at the 1932 Summer Olympics
Cyclists at the 1936 Summer Olympics
Olympic medalists in cycling
People from Chaumont, Haute-Marne
Medalists at the 1932 Summer Olympics
Medalists at the 1936 Summer Olympics
French track cyclists
Sportspeople from Haute-Marne
Cyclists from Grand Est
20th-century French people